Eway, E-Way, or any other variant, may refer to:
 eWay, global electronic payment system
 eway, an electronic street map application for Australia by Ausway
 E-way, abbreviation of expressway
 e-way, electronic toll-type toll road
 E-Way (1990 song), song by Dirty District from the 1990 album Pousse au crime et Longueurs de temps
 EWAY, light rail and bus system proposed for Belfast, Northern Ireland, UK